Wharf Angel is a 1934 American drama film directed by William Cameron Menzies and George Somnes and starring Victor McLaglen, Dorothy Dell, David Landau, and Preston Foster. Wharf Angel was the first screenplay of Stephen Morehouse Avery.

Premise
Two stokers who work on the same ship become rivals for the love of a woman who works in a saloon in the tough Barbary Coast area of San Francisco.

Cast
 Victor McLaglen as Turk
 Dorothy Dell as	Toy
 Preston Foster as 	Como Murphy
 Alison Skipworth as 	Mother Bright
 David Landau as 	Moore
 John Rogers as 	Goliath
 Mischa Auer as 	Sadik
 Alfred Delcambre as 	Steve
 James Burke as 	Brooklyn Jack
 Frank Sheridan as 	The Skipper
 Donald E. Wilson as 	Slim
 John Northpole as 	Vasil
 Alice Lake as 	Saloon Girl 
 Grace Bradley as 	Saloon Girl
 Jill Dennett as Saloon Girl
 Jack Cheatham as Sailor

References

External links
IMDB entry

1934 drama films
1934 films
American drama films
American black-and-white films
Films directed by William Cameron Menzies
Paramount Pictures films
1930s English-language films
1930s American films